Tatyanino is a rural locality (a village) in Nikolotorzhskoye Rural Settlement, Kirillovsky District, Vologda Oblast, Russia. The population was 10 as of 2002.

Geography 
Tatyanino is located 45 km northeast of Kirillov (the district's administrative centre) by road. Khmelevitsy is the nearest rural locality.

References 

Rural localities in Kirillovsky District